Halfway Home may refer to:

In music
Half Way Home (band), American rock band

Albums
Halfway Home (album), by Preston Reed, 1991
Half Way Home (album), by DeeExpus, 2008

Songs
"Halfway Home" (song), by Jess Moskaluke, 2021
"Halfway Home", a song by Broken Social Scene from Hug of Thunder
"Halfway Home", a song by Carly Pearce from Carly Pearce
"Halfway Home", a song by Shed Seven from Let It Ride
"Halfway Home", a song by TV on the Radio from Dear Science

Other uses
Halfway Home (TV series), a 2007 American sitcom
Halfway Home, a 1991 novel by Paul Monette

See also
Halfway house (disambiguation)